Oltmannsiellopsidaceae is a family of green algae in the order Oltmannsiellopsidales.

References

Oltmannsiellopsidales
Ulvophyceae families